George Hobson may refer to:

 George Andrew Hobson (1854–1917), British civil engineer and bridge builder
 George Hobson (footballer) (1903–1993), English footballer
 George H. Hobson (1908–2001), American athlete and sports coach
 George Hobson (wrestler), New Zealand wrestler